Donji Tavankut, also known simply as Tavankut (Таванкут), is a village located some 16 km west of Subotica, Serbia. It is located in the Subotica municipality, in the North Bačka District of Serbia, in the Autonomous Province of Vojvodina.

Name
In Serbian the village is known as Donji Tavankut or Доњи Таванкут, in Croatian as Donji Tavankut and in Hungarian as Alsótavankút.

Population

1991
According to the 1991 Census, Donji Tavankut had a population of 2,710 inhabitants, including:
Bunjevci = 989
Croats = 877
Yugoslavs = 600
Hungarians = 97
Serbs = 71

2002
According to the 2002 Census, Donji Tavankut has a population of 2,631 inhabitants, including:
Croats = 1,234 (46.90%)
Bunjevci = 787 (29.91%)
Serbs = 190 (7.22%)
Yugoslavs = 137 (5.21%)
Hungarians = 117 (4.45%)

Historical population
1981: 2,719 
1991: 2,710
2002: 2,631

Geography

Tavankut includes several relatively separate smaller communities ("kraj"), such as Čikerija (or Čekerija), Sajc (or Nemirna ravnica), Vuković Kraj, Marinkić Kraj, Zlatni Kraj, Skenderovo, Dikanovac, Kaponja (or Kapunja).

Features

It has two railway stations (Donji Tavankut and Skenderovo) on the railroad from Subotica to Sombor (and further to Bezdan, Apatin or Erdut). It also has a primary school (”Matija Gubec”), and football (soccer) club OFK Tavankut. The main pubs/cafés in Tavankut are: Tango, Teens, Jugoslavija (closed down), and Tri muve.

Rv unsourced section.

See also
Gornji Tavankut
List of places in Serbia
List of cities, towns and villages in Vojvodina

References

Slobodan Ćurčić, Broj stanovnika Vojvodine, Novi Sad, 1996.

External links
 HKPD Matija Gubec Tavankut

Subotica
Places in Bačka
Bunjevci